5th Cell is an independently owned video game developer founded in 2003 as 5th Cell Media, LLC. led by Jeremiah Slaczka and Marius Falhbusch. The company is most well known for creating the Drawn to Life and Scribblenauts series.

Overview
Founded on August 28, 2003 by Joseph M. Tringali, Jeremiah Slaczka and Brett Caird, the company started out developing mobile games working with such publishers as THQ Wireless, JAMDAT Mobile (now EA Mobile) and UIEvolution (a former subsidiary of Square Enix).

On August 2, 2004, THQ Wireless announced it would publish 5th Cell's first three original mobile games: Siege, SEAL Team 6 and Mini Poccha.

In 2006, 5th Cell transitioned into Nintendo DS and casual game development. While they have worked with licenses and work for hire in the past, the core focus has moved completely onto building innovative, original video games.

In an IGN interview with Michael Thomsen, Jeremiah Slaczka, the company's creative director, was asked "What kinds of games do you ultimately want to be known for?". He responded by saying: 

On April 21, 2006, IGN revealed 5th Cell's first Nintendo DS game Drawn to Life, an original title.

On June 1, 2006, 5th Cell announced its partnership with Merscom to publish D.N.A, a PC casual game and also an original title.

On May 9, 2007, THQ announced it would publish Drawn to Life, an action-adventure/platformer hybrid with the unique twist of the player drawing the hero and the world itself using the DS's touchpad.
 THQ released the game worldwide in 2007 and 2008. According to Next-Gen.biz from the game's launch (September 2007) until March 1, 2008 (6 months) the game had sold 820,000 units worldwide and was ranked 61st of the top 100 selling video games of the last 12 months.

On April 2, 2008, THQ announced it was publishing 5th Cell's next Nintendo DS game, Lock's Quest, an original action-strategy game where the player first builds defenses and then battle against an invading clockwork army all racing against the clock.

On December 5, 2008, 5th Cell unveiled its next Nintendo DS game on IGN.com, Scribblenauts, an emergent action puzzle game where the player can write anything they can think of to help them solve the puzzle. On May 1, 2009, Warner Bros. Interactive Entertainment announced it would be publishing Scribblenauts. On September 15, 2009, Scribblenauts was released in North America, with its Australian release being on September 30 and European release on October 9. According to the NPD Group, Scribblenauts sold 194,000 units in the United States during September 2009, following Mario & Luigi: Bowser's Inside Story and Kingdom Hearts 358/2 Days in top Nintendo DS sales. A sequel, Super Scribblenauts was released on the DS in North America on October 12, 2010, Australia on October 27th and Europe on October 29. The game improved on many aspects of the original, adding more words, introducing adjectives and tweaking the controls to accommodate use of the D-Pad. A remake of the original Scribblenauts on iOS, called Scribblenauts Remix, was released by Warner Bros. Interactive on October 12, 2011. Instead of 5th Cell, it was actually ported to the platform by developers Iron Galaxy. The iOS version provides forty levels from both Scribblenauts and its sequel, along with ten new levels for the iOS.

At Nintendo's E3 2012 press conference, they announced the third game, Scribblenauts Unlimited, for both Wii U and Nintendo 3DS, marking the series' debut on the Nintendo 3DS platform, and on a home video game console, the Wii U. It saw release for Nintendo 3DS on November 13, 2012, and for Wii U and PC on November 18, 2012. The game was a lot different from its predecessors as it moved to a more adventure-based formula that relied on an open world filled with non-player characters, rather than choosing individual puzzles to earn Starites. It also introduced a new object editor which was present on the Wii U and PC versions, but not the 3DS version. A sequel, Scribblenauts Unmasked: A DC Comics Adventure, was released in September 2013 and featured characters and places from the DC Comics universe.

In 2015, 5th Cell tried to fund their new project Anchors in the Drift via crowdfunding website fig.co. The game was planned to be a free-to-play action-RPG, however, it didn't reach the funding goal of $500,000 and development stopped after the unsuccessful campaign.

On March 24, 2016, following the cancellation of the mobile game Scribblenauts: Fighting Words by publisher Warner Bros. Interactive Entertainment, heavy layoffs severely impacted the company. They remain in operation, but currently only a "tiny" number of employees remain.

Original titles

Canceled 
 Scribblenauts Fighting Words, a puzzle RPG spin off of the original, cancelled in 2016.
Anchors in the Drift, an action RPG game cancelled in 2015. Came back as a game with the same name but that also got cancelled.
Scribblenauts Worlds, a 3D beat-em-up game cancelled in 2014.

Licensed titles
2004
Lemony Snicket's A Series of Unfortunate Events (mobile) - published by Electronic Arts
2005
Darts Pro! (mobile) - published by THQ
Ministry of Sound: Club Manager (mobile) - published by THQ
2006
Pat Sajak's Lucky Letters (mobile) - developed for UIEvolution (an ex-subsidiary of Square Enix)
Moto GP Manager (mobile) - published by THQ
Full Spectrum Warrior: Mobile (mobile) - published by THQ

Spin-off titles
These are titles directly based on 5TH Cell's original games that were not developed by 5TH Cell themselves.
2008
Drawn to Life: SpongeBob SquarePants Edition (DS) - developed by Altron, published by THQ
2009
Drawn to Life: The Next Chapter (Wii) - developed by Planet Moon Studios, published by THQ
2011
 Scribblenauts Remix (iOS)  - co-developed by Iron Galaxy Studios and 5TH Cell, published by Warner Bros. Interactive Entertainment
2018
 Scribblenauts Showdown (PlayStation 4, Xbox One, Nintendo Switch)  - developed by Shiver, published by Warner Bros. Interactive Entertainment
2020

 Drawn to Life: Two Realms (Nintendo Switch, Steam, iOS, Android) - developed by Digital Continue, published by 505 Games

References

External links
Official 5TH Cell Website

5th Cell games
Video game development companies
American companies established in 2003
Video game companies established in 2003
Companies based in Bellevue, Washington
Video game companies of the United States
2003 establishments in Washington (state)
Privately held companies based in Washington (state)